Khartoum Place is a pedestrianised city square in the Auckland CBD, New Zealand. The square, protected by several mature trees, is located between Lorne Street and Kitchener Street, and provides a stairway connection between the two street levels.

In 1993, in honour of the centenary of women's suffrage in New Zealand, a painted 2000–tile memorial and waterfall dedicated to Auckland's and New Zealand women's suffrage movement was installed in the stairway. The artist Claudia Pond Eyley and ceramicist Jan Morrison choose the Auckland-based suffragists depicted in the memorial. The women featured in the lower and main section include (from left): 
 Amey Daldy – president of the Auckland Women's Franchise League, 
 Anne Ward – inaugural president of the Women's Christian Temperance Union of New Zealand (WCTU NZ), 
 Lizzie Frost – journalist, 
 Matilda Allsopp – one of the first seven women enrolled to vote in Auckland for the Parliamentary elections, 
 Elisabeth Yates – first woman mayor in New Zealand and the British Empire, 
 Annie Jane Schnackenberg – president of the WCTU NZ in 1893, 
 Fanny Brown – another woman celebrated for being among the first seven Auckland women to vote for Parliament, and 
 Ada Wells – activist in the WCTU NZ Christchurch.

In 2006/2007, $2.2 million were spent on upgrading the lower part of the square, with Council intending to spend another $1 million in 2011 to complete the upgrade on the upper level.

The Auckland Art Gallery is located at the Kitchener Street end of the square, with other related exhibition and public space also arrayed around the square. In 2010 supporters of the Art Gallery campaigned to have the Women's Suffrage Memorial removed, arguing that it blocked the view from Lorne Street to the upgraded Art Gallery entrance. In 2006, there had already been an attempt to remove the memorial from the site. Brian Rudman, in an editorial in The New Zealand Herald spoke out against the removal, lambasting the proposed "processional stairway":

"They see the wide stairway as a giant vacuum cleaner, sucking up pedestrians as they wander along Lorne St and dumping them into the new palace of fine arts."

He also noted that – contrary to the 2006 attempt to have the Women's Suffrage Memorial removed, when the opponents (also connected to the Art Gallery) argued that it had no artistic merit (and were opposed by a public outcry) – in 2010 they argued from an urban design perspective, and were citing such "precedents" as Haussmann's leveling of parts of Paris for its grand new avenues.

In 2011 the Auckland City Council voted to protect the Women's Suffrage Memorial in Khartoum Place in perpetuity.

Lower Khartoum Place was renamed Te Hā o Hine Suffrage Place in July 2016 following a decision by the Waitematā Local Board. Te Hā o Hine comes from the whakatauki (proverb) ‘Me aro koe ki te hā o Hine ahu one’ which means ‘pay heed to the dignity of women’.

References

External links 
Khartoum Place upgrade (Auckland City Council upgrade plans – unconnected (as of 18 February 2010) to the proposal to remove the memorial)

Squares in Auckland
Monuments and memorials to women's suffrage
Auckland CBD